The Cactus Pheasant Classic was an annual curling tournament, held in late October in Brooks, Alberta. It was part of the World Curling Tour. The purse for the event was $70,000 Cdn. It has not been held since 2013.

Past champions
Only skip's name is displayed.

External links

2007 establishments in Alberta
Recurring sporting events established in 2007
October events
Former World Curling Tour events
Curling in Alberta
Brooks, Alberta
2013 disestablishments in Alberta
Recurring sporting events disestablished in 2013